Places in Bangladesh named Baghmara include:

West Bāghmāra, also called West Bagmara and Bāghmārā, located at 
Bāghmāra, located at 
Bāghmāra, located at 
Bāghmāra, also called Bagmara, located at 
Bāghmāra, located at 
Bāghmāra, located at 
Bāghmāra, also called Bagmara, located at 
Bāghmāra, located at 
Bāghmāra, located at 
Bāghmāra, located at 
Bagmara, also called Bāghmāra, located at 
Bāghmāra, also called Bagmara, located at 
Baghmara, Barisal District, located at 
Bāghmāra, located at 
 Bāghmāra, Chittagong, located at 
 Bāghmāra, Chittagong, located at 

Baghmara